The Jamestown Expos were a minor league baseball franchise located in Jamestown, New York. The team existed under various names from 1939 through 1993 and played in the New York–Penn League and its predecessor, the Pennsylvania–Ontario–New York League.

Jamestown Falcons 
The first team, in 1939, was known as the Jamestown Jaguars, a Pittsburgh Pirates affiliate, but it folded after only one year.  On July 13, 1940 the Niagara Falls Rainbows moved to Jamestown and became the Jamestown Falcons.

The Falcons played from 1939–1957. They played in the Pennsylvania–Ontario–New York League (PONY League) from 1940 to 1956, and in the New York–Penn League in 1957. They were affiliated with the Detroit Tigers from 1941 to 1942 and from 1944 to 1956. In 1943, they were affiliated with the St. Louis Cardinals. They were affiliated with the Pittsburgh Pirates in 1957. The team reformed in 1961 after a 3-year absence. They were called the Jamestown Tigers from 1961–1965, the Jamestown Dodgers in 1966 and the Jamestown Braves in 1967 (reflecting their affiliations with the Tigers, Los Angeles Dodgers and Atlanta Braves respectively) before returning to the Falcons name from 1968–1972.

Ollie Carnegie was the team's manager during the 1944 season.

From 1941 onward, they played their home games at Jamestown Municipal Stadium, now known as Russell Dietrick Park.

Montreal Expos affiliate
The team was known as the Jamestown Expos from 1977 to 1993, although Jamestown was affiliated with Montreal in 1970 and 1971, at the time the team was called the Falcons. Major League pitcher Randy Johnson began his career with the Expos in 1985.

In 1990, the television show Candid Camera planned to do a segment of minor league baseball. After consulting the front office in Montreal, Candid Camera came to Jamestown to do a prank on pitcher Bob Baxter. Only the visiting team manager, the catcher for the Expos and the other umpires knew about the prank. Host Peter Funt played as the umpire, as the catcher gave fake signals to pitcher Baxter.

The Expos were relocated to Vermont after the 1993 season, eventually becoming the Vermont Lake Monsters. However, the New York–Penn League maintained a presence in Jamestown, immediately relocating the Niagara Falls Rapids to Jamestown in 1994 and naming that team the Jamestown Jammers. The Jammers would last in Jamestown until the end of the 2014 season, at which point the New York–Penn League left Jamestown permanently.

Notable alumni (1939-1993)

Hall of Fame alumni

 Nellie Fox (1944) Inducted, 1997
 Randy Johnson (1985) Inducted, 2015

Notable alumni
 Antonio Alfonseca (1993) 2000 NL Saves Leader
 Tim Blackwell (1970)
 Mike Blowers (1986)
 Frank Bolling (1951) 4 x MLB All-Star
 Donn Clendenon (1957) 1969 World Series Most Valuable Player
 Francisco Cordero (1995-1996) 3 x MLB All-Star
 Wil Cordero (1988) MLB All-Star
 Cecil Cooper (1968) 5 x MLB All-Star
 Delino DeShields (1987) 
 Pat Dobson (1963) MLB-All Star
 Dwight Evans (1969) 8 x Gold Glove; 3 x MLB All-Star
 Andres Galarraga (1981) 5 x MLB All-Star; 1993 NL Batting Title
 Joe Ginsberg (1944)
 Marquis Grissom (1988) 2 x MLB All-Star
 Mark Grudzielanek (1991) MLB All-Star
 John Hiller (1963) MLB All-Star
 Julián Javier (1957) 2 x MLB All-Star
 Jackie Jensen (1970) 3 x MLB All-Star; 1958 AL Most Valuable Player
 Gabe Kapler (1995) 
 Frank Lary (1950) 3 x MLB All-Star
 Charley Lau (1950)
 Jim Leyland (1965) 3 x MLB Manager of the Year (1990, 1992, 2006); Manager: 1997 World Series Champion Florida Marlins
 Danny Litwhiler (1954) MLB All-Star
 Sal Maglie (1940) 2 x MLB All-Star
 Pat Mullin (1956) 2 x MLB All-Star
 Ben Oglivie (1968) 1980 AL HR Leader; 3 x MLB All-Star
 Stubby Overmire (1962-1963)
 Larry Parrish (1972) 2 x MLB All-Star
 Tony Phillips (1978) 
 Phil Regan (1956) MLB-All Star
 Buck Rodgers (1956) 1997 NL Manager of the Year
 Gary Roenicke (1973)
 Jim Rooker (1961-1962)
 Tony Scott (1971) 
 Bob Shaw (1953) MLB All-Star
 Matt Stairs (1989)
 John Vander Wal (1987)

References

External links
Jamestown - Baseball Reference

Defunct baseball teams in New York (state)
Professional baseball teams in New York (state)
Montreal Expos minor league affiliates
Boston Red Sox minor league affiliates
Atlanta Braves minor league affiliates
Los Angeles Dodgers minor league affiliates
St. Louis Cardinals minor league affiliates
Pittsburgh Pirates minor league affiliates
Sports in Jamestown, New York
Defunct minor league baseball teams
Defunct New York–Penn League teams
Baseball teams established in 1939
1939 establishments in New York (state)
1993 disestablishments in New York (state)
Baseball teams disestablished in 1993